"You Comb Her Hair" is a song by George Jones. It was released as a single in 1963 and reached #5 on the Billboard country singles chart. It was written by Hank Cochran and Harlan Howard. The song, an ode of love and devotion from a father to his daughter, was typical of Jones's releases during this period. In a 1994 article by Nick Tosches for the Texas Monthly, Jones confessed that he regarded the early sixties as his finest period, stating, "We did a lot of the pure country then."  Johnny Cash recorded the song for his 1966 album Happiness Is You.

Discography

1963 singles
George Jones songs
Songs written by Hank Cochran
Songs written by Harlan Howard
1963 songs
Song recordings produced by Pappy Daily
United Artists Records singles